Colonel Reginald Edward Harry Dyer, CB (9 October 1864 – 23 July 1927) was an officer of the Bengal Army and later the newly constituted British Indian Army. His military career began serving briefly in the regular British Army before transferring to serve with the Presidency armies of India. As a temporary brigadier-general, he was responsible for the Jallianwala Bagh massacre that took place on 13 April 1919 in Amritsar (in the province of Punjab). He has been called "the Butcher of Amritsar", because of his order to fire on a peaceful crowd. The official report stated that this resulted in the killing of at least 379 people and the injuring of over a thousand more. Some submissions to the official inquiry suggested a higher number of deaths.

Subsequently, Dyer was removed from duty and widely condemned both in Britain and India, but he became a celebrated hero among some with connections to the British Raj. Some historians argue the episode was a decisive step towards the end of British rule in India.

Early life

Dyer was born in Murree, in the Punjab province of British India, which is now in Pakistan. He was the son of Edward Dyer, a brewer who managed the Murree Brewery, and Mary Passmore. He spent his childhood in Murree and Shimla and received his early education at the Lawrence College Ghora Gali, Murree and Bishop Cotton School in Shimla. From eleven he attended Midleton College in County Cork, Ireland, before briefly studying medicine, at the Royal College of Surgeons in Ireland, before deciding on a military career.

Assignments
In 1885, soon after graduating from the Royal Military College, Sandhurst, Dyer was commissioned into the Queen's Royal Regiment (West Surrey) as a lieutenant, and performed riot control duties in Belfast (1886) and served in the Third Burmese War (1886–87). He transferred to the Bengal Army, initially joining the Bengal Staff Corps as a lieutenant in 1887. He was attached to the 39th Bengal Infantry, later transferring to the 29th Punjabis. He married Frances Annie Ommaney, the daughter of Edmund Piper Ommaney, on 4 April 1888, in St Martin's Church, Jhansi, India. The first of their three children, Gladys, was born in Shimla, India, in 1889. Dyer served in the latter in the Black Mountain campaign (1888), the Chitral Relief (1895) (promoted to captain in 1896) and the Mahsud blockade (1901–02). In 1901 he was appointed a deputy assistant adjutant general.

In August 1903, Dyer was promoted to major, and served with the Landi Kotal Expedition (1908). He commanded the 25th Punjabis in India and Hong Kong and was promoted to lieutenant-colonel in 1910. During the First World War (1914–18), he commanded the Seistan Force, for which he was mentioned in dispatches and made a Companion of the Order of the Bath (CB). He was promoted colonel in 1915, and was promoted to temporary brigadier general in 1916. In 1919, about a month after the Jallianwala Bagh massacre, Dyer served in the Third Anglo-Afghan War. His brigade relieved the garrison of Thal, for which he was again mentioned in dispatches. For a few months in 1919 he was posted to the 5th Brigade at Jamrud.

He retired on 17 July 1920, retaining the rank of colonel.

Background
In 1919, the European population in Punjab feared the locals would overthrow British rule. A nationwide hartal (strike action), which was called on 30 March (later changed to 6 April) by Mahatma Gandhi, had turned violent in some areas. Authorities were also becoming concerned by displays of Hindu-Muslim unity. Michael O'Dwyer, the Lieutenant-Governor of Punjab, decided to deport major agitators from the province. One of those targeted was Dr. Satyapal, a Hindu who had served with the Royal Army Medical Corps during the First World War. He advocated non-violent civil disobedience and was forbidden by the authorities to speak publicly. Another agitator was Dr. Saifuddin Kitchlew, a Muslim barrister who wanted political change and also preached non-violence. The district magistrate, acting on orders from the Punjab government, had the two leaders arrested.

The shooting of protesters resulted in a mob forming and returning to the city centre of Amritsar, setting fire to government buildings and attacking Europeans in the city. Three British bank employees were beaten to death, and Miss Marcella Sherwood, who supervised the Mission Day School for Girls, was cycling around the city to close her schools when she was assaulted by a mob in a narrow street called the Kucha Kurrichhan. Sherwood was rescued from the mob by locals. They hid the teacher, who was hurt in the beating, before moving her to the fort. Dyer, who was the commandant of the infantry brigade in Jalandhar, decided to take action. He arrived on 11 April to assume command.

Though authorities initially claimed that the massacre was triggered by the assault on Sherwood, regimental diaries reveal that this was merely a pretext. Instead, Dyer and O'Dwyer feared an imminent mutiny in Punjab similar to the Indian Rebellion of 1857.

Amritsar massacre

Dyer is infamous for the orders that he gave on 13 April 1919 in Amritsar. It was by his command that 50 troops, including 25 Gurkhas of 1/9 Gurkha Rifles (1st battalion, 9th Gurkha Rifles), 25 Pathans and Baluch and 59th Sindh Rifles, all armed with .303 Lee–Enfield rifles, opened fire on a non-violent gathering of unarmed civilians, men, women, elderlies and children, at the Jallianwalla Bagh, in what later came to be known as the Amritsar massacre.

The civilians had assembled at Jallianwala Bagh to participate in the annual Baisakhi celebrations which are both a religious and a cultural festival of the Punjabis. Coming from outside the city, they may have been unaware of the martial law that had been imposed. The Bagh-space comprised  and was walled on all sides, except for five entrances. Four of the entrances were very narrow, admitting only a few people at a time. The fifth entrance was blocked by the armed soldiers, as well as by two armoured cars with machine guns. The vehicles were unable to pass through the entrance. Upon entering the park, the general ordered the troops to shoot directly into the gathering. The shooting continued unabated for about 10 minutes, and the soldiers' supply of 1,650 rounds of ammunition was almost exhausted.

Dyer is reported to have, from time to time, "checked his fire and directed it upon places where the crowd was thickest", not because the crowd was slow to disperse, but because he "had made up his mind to punish them for having assembled there." Some of the soldiers initially shot into the air, at which Dyer shouted: "Fire low. What have you been brought here for?" Later, Dyer's own testimony revealed that the crowd was not given any warning to disperse and he was not remorseful for having ordered his troops to shoot.

The Hunter Commission report on the incident, published the following year by the Government of India, criticised both Dyer, and the Government of the Punjab for failing to compile a casualty count, so quoted a figure offered by the Sewa Samati (A Social Services Society) of 379 identified dead, comprising 337 men, 41 boys and a six-week-old baby, with approximately 1,100 wounded, of which 192 were seriously injured. However other estimates, from government civil servants in the city (commissioned by the Punjab Sub-committee of Indian National Congress), as well as counts from the Home Political, cite numbers of well over a thousand dead. According to a Home Political Deposit report, the number was more than 1,000, with more than 1,200 wounded. Dr Smith, a British civil surgeon at Amritsar, estimated that there were over 1,800 casualties. The deliberate infliction of these casualties earned Dyer the epithet of the "Butcher of Amritsar".

Statement to restore law and order
The day after the massacre Dyer attempted to restore law and order. The following is the English translation of Dyer's Urdu statement directed at the local residents of Amritsar on the afternoon of 14 April 1919, a day after the Amritsar massacre:

Crawling order
Dyer designated the spot as sacred where Marcella Sherwood was assaulted. Daytime pickets were placed at either end of the street. The order was not required at night due to a curfew. The order effectively closed the street. The houses did not have any back doors and the inhabitants could not go out without climbing down from their roofs. This order was in effect from 19 April until 25 April 1919.

Reaction in Britain and British India
A committee of enquiry, chaired by Lord Hunter, was established to investigate the massacre. The committee's report criticised Dyer, arguing that in "continuing firing as long as he did, it appears to us that Colonel Dyer committed a grave error." Dissenting members argued that the martial law regime's use of force was wholly unjustified. "Colonel Dyer thought he had crushed the rebellion and Michael O'Dwyer was of the same view," they wrote, "(but) there was no rebellion which required to be crushed."

Dyer was met by the Adjutant-General of India, Lieutenant-General Havelock Hudson, who told him that he was relieved of his command. He was told later by the Commander-in-Chief in India, General Charles Monro, to resign his post and that he would not be reemployed.

Dyer tried to win over the Sikhs as best as he could. He forced the manager of the Golden Temple, and Sunder Singh Majithia, to use their influence over the Sikhs, in favour of the government. As a result, priests of the Golden Temple invited him to the sacred shrine and presented him with a Siropa (turban and sword).

The Morning Post claimed Dyer was "the man who saved India" and started a benefit fund which raised over £26,000 sterling. Sources differ on how much, if anything Rudyard Kipling contributed to this fund and some sources claim that 'the man who saved India' line came from Kipling.

Dyer was heavily criticised both in Britain and India. Several senior and influential British government officials and Indians spoke out against him, including:
Pandit Motilal Nehru, father of Jawaharlal Nehru, the first Prime Minister of India, who called the massacre the "saddest and most revealing of all".
Rabindranath Tagore, the first Asian Nobel Laureate and distinguished Indian educator, who renounced his knighthood in protest against the massacre and said, "a great crime has been done in the name of law in the Punjab".
Shankaran Nair, who resigned his membership of the Viceroy's Executive Council in the Legislative Council of Punjab in protest at the massacre.
Punjab Legislative Council members Nawab Din Murad and Kartar Singh, who described the massacre as "neither just nor humane."
Charles Freer Andrews, an Anglican priest and friend of Gandhi, who termed the Jallianwala Bagh massacre as a "cold-blooded massacre and inhumane."
Brigadier-General Surtees, who stated in the Dyer debate that "we hold India by force – undoubtedly by force".
Edwin Samuel Montagu, the Secretary of State for India, who called it "a grave error in judgement". In a debate in the House of Commons, he asked, "Are you going to keep your hold on India by terrorism, racial humiliation, subordination and frightfulness, or are you going to rest it upon the goodwill and the growing goodwill of the people of your Indian Empire?"
Winston Churchill, at the time Britain's Secretary of State for War, who called the massacre "an episode without precedent or parallel in the modern history of the British Empire… an extraordinary event, a monstrous event, an event which stands in singular and sinister isolation... the crowd was neither armed nor attacking" during a debate in the House of Commons. In a letter to the leader of the Liberals and former Secretary of State for India, the Marquess of Crewe, he wrote, "My own opinion is that the offence amounted to murder, or alternatively manslaughter."
Leader of the Liberal Party and former Prime Minister H. H. Asquith, who observed: "There has never been such an incident in the whole annals of Anglo-Indian history, nor, I believe, in the history of our empire since its very inception down to present day. It is one of the worst outrages in the whole of our history."
B. G. Horniman, who observed: "No event within living memory, probably, has made so deep and painful impression on the mind of the public in this country [Britain] as what came to be known as the Amritsar massacre."

The era of O'Dwyer and Dyer has been deemed "an era of misdeeds of British administration in India".

During the Dyer debates in the Parliament of the United Kingdom, there was both praise and condemnation of Dyer. In 1920, the British Labour Party Conference at Scarborough unanimously passed a resolution denouncing the Amritsar massacre as a "cruel and barbarous action" of British officers in Punjab, and called for their trial, the recall of Michael O'Dwyer and the Viceroy, Lord Chelmsford, and the repealing of repressive legislation.

Dyer's response and motivation
Dyer made three conflicting sets of statements about his motives and actions. At first, immediately after he carried out the massacre, he made a series of partial but slightly varying explanations with the aim of exonerating himself from any blame. Later, after receiving approval for his actions from all his superiors in India, both civil and military, Dyer stated that his actions were a deliberate attempt to punish people he believed were rebels, and to make an example for the rest of the Punjab that would stop what he regarded as a rebellion. Finally, on Dyer's return to England in disgrace in 1920, his lawyers argued that his actions, though deliberate and premeditated, were justified because he was facing an insurrection and that, on those grounds, any amount of firing was permissible.

Dyer wrote an article in the Globe of 21 January 1921, entitled, "The Peril to the Empire". It commenced with "India does not want self-government. She does not understand it." He wrote later that:
It is only to an enlightened people that free speech and a free press can be extended. The Indian people want no such enlightenment.
There should be an eleventh commandment in India, "Thou shalt not agitate".
The time will come to India when a strong hand will be exerted against malice and 'perversion' of good order.
Gandhi will not lead India to capable self-government. The British Raj must continue, firm and unshaken in its administration of justice to all men.

In his official response to the Hunter commission that inquired into the shooting, Dyer was unremorseful and stated: "I think it quite possible that I could have dispersed the crowd without firing but they would have come back again and laughed, and I would have made, what I consider, a fool of myself."

However, in his account of the massacre Nick Lloyd comments that although Dyer later claimed to have undertaken the massacre to "save" British India, he had had no such idea in his mind that fateful afternoon. As well as being "dazed and shaken up" – hardly the response of a soldier who had had murder in his mind – all the witnesses recall how Dyer "was unnerved and deeply upset about what had happened".

Nigel Collett – author of the biography The Butcher of Amritsar – is convinced that the Amritsar massacre preyed on Dyer's mind from the very day he opened fire. "He spent the rest of his life trying to justify himself. He persuaded himself it had been his duty to act as he did, but he could not persuade his soul that he had done right. It rotted his mind and, I am guessing here, added to his sickness."

Collett, in his book, portrays Dyer as a man who got on extremely well with his men and his juniors, while his contemporaries and seniors were always wary of him. When he approached a complex political problem, his one thought was to have order; his one tool to get it was the gun. He notes that, at the time of the Amritsar massacre, Dyer was wracked by ill-health and separated from his beloved family. Collett speculates that perhaps this encouraged Dyer's extreme view that the Punjab was on the brink of rebellion, with the empire about to collapse, and feared a mutiny like that of 1857. The solution, he decided, was not just to restore order but to show that the state was in charge. It was not enough to have shops and businesses reopen in Amritsar – an example was needed of the consequences of insubordination.

Collett quotes Dyer himself on the motivations that drove him to act as he did: "...It was no longer a question of merely dispersing the crowd but one of producing a sufficient moral effect, from a military point of view, not only on those who were present but more specially throughout the Punjab. There could be no question of undue severity. The mutineers had thrown out the challenge and the punishment, if administered at all, must be complete, unhesitating and immediate."

Historian Gordon Johnson comments that "...Dyer's actions ran counter to Army regulations. These required that force should be constrained by what was reasonable to achieve an immediate objective; minimum, not maximum, force should be deployed. Moreover, proper warning had to be given. On 13 April 1919, as demonstrated by Collett, Dyer ignored this. While he may have believed the Raj was threatened, and may have thought the mob was out to attack him and his soldiers, this does not justify his cavalier abuse of procedure and his indifference to Indian suffering. In so behaving, he brought not only death to the innocent but also destroyed himself and undermined the empire in which he took so much pride."

Settlement in Britain
Churchill, the then Secretary of State for War, wanted Dyer to be disciplined, but the Army Council superseded by him decided to allow Dyer to resign with no plan for further punishment. Following Churchill's speech defending the council's decision and a debate in Parliament, on 8 July 1920 MPs voted for the government by a majority of 247 to 37; a motion calling for approval of Dyer's actions was defeated by a majority of 230 to 129.

Having been born in India and educated in Ireland, Dyer then settled in Britain. He was presented with a gift of £26,000 sterling, a huge sum in those days, which emerged from the fund raised on his behalf by the Morning Post, a conservative, pro-imperialist newspaper which later merged with the Daily Telegraph. A "Thirteen Women Committee" was constituted to present "the Saviour of the Punjab with the sword of honour and a purse". Large contributions to the fund were made by civil servants and by British Army and Indian Army officers, although serving members of the military were not allowed to donate to political funds under the King's Regulations (para. 443).

The Morning Post had supported Dyer's action on the grounds that the massacre was necessary to "Protect the honour of European Women".

Many Indians, including Nobel Laureate Rabindranath Tagore, were outraged by the fund for Dyer, particularly due to the families of the victims killed at the Jallianwala Bagh, who were still fighting for government compensation. In the end, they received Rs 500 (then equal to £37.10s.0d) for each victim.

Dyer acquired a farm at Ashton Fields, Ashton Keynes, Wiltshire, which was still given as his address when he died, although in 1925 he had bought a small cottage at Long Ashton on the outskirts of Bristol and spent his last two years there, while one of his sons lived at the farm.

Death

Dyer suffered a series of strokes during the last years of his life and he became increasingly isolated due to the paralysis and speechlessness inflicted by his strokes. He died of cerebral haemorrhage and arteriosclerosis on 23 July 1927. On his deathbed, Dyer reportedly said: 

The Morning Post remembered him in an article titled "The Man Who Saved India" and "He Did His Duty" but the (Liberal) Westminster Gazette wrote a contrary opinion: "No British action, during the whole course of our history in India, has struck a severer blow to Indian faith in British justice than the massacre at Amritsar."

Although still owning property in Wiltshire, Dyer died at his cottage in Somerset, St Martin's, Long Ashton, near Bristol. He left an estate valued at £11,941, .

Popular culture
A fictionalised account of Dyer's actions in Amritsar is contained in the 1981 Booker Prize winning novel Midnight's Children, by author Salman Rushdie (see List of Midnight's Children characters).

Dyer is played by Edward Fox in the 1982 film Gandhi. He is played by Tom Alter in the 2000 Bollywood movie Shaheed Udham Singh and by Andrew Havill in the 2021 Bollywood movie Sardar Udham.

Role of Michael O'Dwyer 
Michael O'Dwyer, Lieutenant-Governor of Punjab from 1913 to 1919, endorsed Dyer and called the massacre a "correct" action. Some historians now believe he premeditated the massacre and set Dyer to work. Many Indians blamed O'Dwyer, and while Dyer was never assaulted, O'Dwyer was assassinated in London in 1940 by an Indian revolutionary, Sardar Udham Singh in retaliation for his role in the massacre.

Family
In 1888 Dyer married Frances Anne Trevor Ommaney; they had one daughter (Gladys Mary, born 1889) and two sons (Ivon Reginald, born 1895 and Geoffrey Edward MacLeod, born 1896).

References

Sources

Further reading

External links
 Army Council and General Dyer 8 July 1920, UK House of Commons
 Winston Churchill's Amritsar Speech, 8 July 1920, UK House of Commons
  Michael O'Dwyer (Assassination) 14 March 1940, UK House of Commons

1864 births
1927 deaths
People from Murree
Indian Army generals of World War I
British military personnel of the Chitral Expedition
British military personnel of the Third Anglo-Burmese War
British military personnel of the Third Anglo-Afghan War
Graduates of the Royal Military College, Sandhurst
Military personnel of British India
Queen's Royal Regiment officers
Bengal Staff Corps officers
People educated at Midleton College
Bishop Cotton School Shimla alumni